Raptor Attack was an enclosed steel roller coaster at the Lightwater Valley theme park in North Yorkshire, United Kingdom. and was the world's first underground subterranean rollercoaster, opening in 1987.

History
In 1987 Lightwater Valley constructed an Anton Schwarzkopf Wildcat roller coaster. The ride was constructed inside a warehouse-type building which is hidden by trees and embankments. This gives the illusion that the ride is actually underground. At opening, the ride was known as Rat Ride and themed around sewer rats. The entry and exit corridors accurately replicated a real sewer and the ride vehicles were giant rat models. The ride took place in complete darkness making it thrilling as riders could not predict the upcoming direction of travel.

Rat Ride closed in October 2009 at the end of the season. On 4 April 2010, the ride reopened under a new name (‘Raptor Attack’) and theme. The ride closed in 2021 and was removed from the theme park.

Ride experience
The ride is now themed on an old abandoned mine shaft and riders queue at the entry point of this shaft. Upon entry, riders walk through a series of tunnels and descend down a spiralling staircase between which water is falling from overhead.

An abandoned office features blood-spattered equipment including a monitor which shows footage of a distressed miner. This footage originally had sound, with the miner calling out a  warning that there is something moving down there and not to send anyone else down the mine. However the sound was removed partway through the season, as younger children thought that the footage was real and were becoming distressed.

Riders then continue onto the boarding station where four-seater mine trains await. Ride operators are dressed in themed miner clothing with hard hats and fluorescent jackets.

The train leaves the station into an area of total darkness and ascends a chain-driven climb. A series of drops follows interlinked between sudden appearances of animatronic velociraptors and sound effects designed to startle the riders. The roller coaster system and layout remains the same as the original 'Rat Ride' but the appearances of the dinosaurs and the rides revamped theming add refreshing new elements to the ride.

When the car returns to the station and riders disembark (after a sudden stop), they pass a steel door from behind which something begins to suddenly  bang very loudly. This is another feature designed to startle departing riders and is activated via motion sensor.

Riders then continue on through the tunnels, passing a hydraulic piston in a pool of water and human bones. The piston suddenly discharges a blast of air from beneath the water, creating a loud noise and splash designed to startle the exiting riders. A staircase is then ascended, another tunnel passed during which sound effects of dinosaur roars and groans play and the surface is reached.

In the immediate area outside the ride exit is the raptor paintball range and riders leave via a merchandise shop which also sells on-ride photographs.

References

Roller coasters in the United Kingdom
1987 establishments in England
Roller coasters introduced in 2010